Henri Bourtayre  (21 October 1915, Biarritz – 10 June 2009, Yvelines) was a French composer.

Works

Operettas 
 Miss Cow-Boy (1947, Paris, Casino-Montparnasse)
 Tout pour elles (1955, Geneva)
 Chevalier du Ciel (1955, Paris,Gaîté-Lyrique)
 Louisiane mes amours (1970, Paris, Châtelet)

Songs 
 1941: Ma Ritournelle (paroles de Maurice Vandair) – Tino Rossi ;
 1942: Dans le chemin du retour (paroles de Maurice Vandair) –  Tino Rossi ;
 1942: Quérida (paroles de Maurice Vandair) –  Jaime Plana ; Marie José ;
 1943: La Guitare à Chiquita (paroles de Maurice Vandair) – Raymond Legrand ;
 1943: Mon cœur est toujours près de toi (paroles de Maurice Vandair) – Georges Guétary ;
 1944: El Cabrero (paroles de Maurice Vandair) –  Marie José ;
 1944: Fleur de Paris (paroles de Maurice Vandair) – Maurice Chevalier, Jacques Hélian ;
 1944: Ma belle au bois dormant (paroles de Maurice Vandair) – Luis Mariano ;
 1945: Baisse un peu l’abat-jour (paroles de Marcel Delmas) – Élyane Célis ;
 1945: C’est la fête au pays (paroles de Maurice Vandair et Maurice Chevalier) –  Maurice Chevalier ;
 1945: Ça fait chanter les Français (paroles de Maurice Vandair et Maurice Chevalier) –  Maurice Chevalier ;
 1945: Chacun son rêve (paroles de Maurice Vandair) – Charles Trenet ;
 1945: Chansons grises… chansons roses (paroles d’Henri Kubnick) –  Michel Roger ;
 1945: Lily Bye… bye ! (paroles de Maurice Vandair) –  Guy Berry, Jacques Hélian ;
 1945: Feu follet (paroles d’Henri Kubnick) –  Michel Roger ;
 1945: La Fille à Domingo (paroles de Maurice Vandair) – Lina Margy ;
 1946: Le Swing à l’école (paroles de Syam et Georgius) – Fred Adison ;
 1946: Pastourelle à Nina (paroles de Maurice Vandair) – Rudy Hirigoyen ;
 1946: Simple histoire (paroles d’André Hornez) –  Lina Margy ;
 1946: Une Fleur sur l’oreille (paroles d’Henri Kubnick) –  Guy Berry ;
 1947: Ma petite Hawaïenne (paroles de Maurice Vandair) –  Tino Rossi ;
 1949: Soleil levant (paroles de Louis Poterat) ; Jean Faustin ;
 1950: Agur (paroles de Maurice Vandair) – André Dassary ;
 1950: La France en rose (paroles d’Albert Willemetz) – Arletty ;
 1953: Viens à la maison (paroles de Robert Lamoureux)- Robert Lamoureux ;
 1954: Il faut si peu de choses (paroles d’Albert Willemetz) – Yvonne Printemps ;
 1966: Oui au whisky (avec Jean-Pierre Bourtayre ; paroles d’E. Meunier) –  Maurice Chevalier.

Film scores 
 1942: Fièvres by Jean Delannoy 
 1943: Le Chant de l'exilé by André Hugon
 1949: Two Loves by Richard Pottier
 1950: La Maison du printemps by Jacques Daroy
 1951: Piédalu à Paris by Jean Loubignac
 1952: Piédalu fait des miracles by Jean Loubignac
 1952]: Foyer perdu by Jean Loubignac
 1952: Son dernier Noël by Jacques Daniel-Norman
 1959: Secret professionnel by Raoul André
 1959: Ça n'arrive qu'aux vivants by Tony Saytor
 1961: Alerte au barrage by Jacques-Daniel Norman
 1973: Now Where Did the 7th Company Get to? by Robert Lamoureux
 1974: Opération Lady Marlène, by Robert Lamoureux
 1974: Impossible Is Not French, by Robert Lamoureux
 1975: On a retrouvé la septième compagnie by Robert Lamoureux
 1977: La Septième Compagnie au clair de lune by Robert Lamoureux

Review 
 OctobER 1950: La Revue de l'Empire by Albert Willemetz, Ded Rysel, André Roussin, music Paul Bonneau, Maurice Yvain, Francis Lopez, Henri Bourtayre, directed by Maurice Lehmann and Léon Deutsch, Théâtre de l'Empire

Book 
 Henri Bourtayre, Fleur de Paris ou 50 ans de souvenirs et de chansons françaises (240 pages booklet in accompaniment of the records Fleur de Paris. 8 May 45-8 May 95. Autour de la victoire. EMI-Une musique, 1995).

Records 
 50 ans de chansons avec Henri Bourtayre (CD de 20 chansons, Coll. Du Caf’conc’ au Music hall, EMI France, 1993)
Fleur de Paris (20 chansons d'Henri Bourtayre), EMI, 1995
Les Chansons de ma jeunesse. 25 artistes chantent les succès d'Henri Bourtayre. Marianne Mélodie, 2008
Chevalier du Ciel- Miss Cow-Boy- Tout pour elle. Opérettes d'Henri Bourtayre. Marianne Mélodie, 2008
Dansez sur les succès d'Henri Bourtayre. Marianne Mélodie, 2009

External links 
 Henri Bourtayre on data.bnf.fr

People from Biarritz
1915 births
2009 deaths
French operetta composers
French film score composers
20th-century French musicians